Nidhanaya is a 1972 Sinhalese language film Dr. Lester James Peries, the screen play, dialog and script by Dr. Tissa Abeysekara, starring Gamini Fonseka and Malini Fonseka. The film stars Gamini Fonseka and Malini Fonseka in lead role along with Shanthi Lekha, Saman Bokalawela and Trilicia Gunawardena in supportive roles. 

Movie is based on a short story written by G.B.Senanayake in one of his short story collection known as "The Revenge". It revolves around a murder which is committed for the purpose of gaining access to a hidden treasure. The film won the Silver Lion of St. Mark award at the 1972 Venice International Film Festival and was also selected as one of the outstanding films of the year, receiving a Diploma, at the London Film Festival. It was also chosen as the best film of the first 50 years of Sri Lankan cinema and was included among the top 100 films of the century by the Cinémathèque Française.

Synopsis

A man known as Willy Abenayake (Gamini Fonseka) who belongs to a wealthy family in a village in Sri Lanka, is interested in superstitious things. One day he finds an old Ola Leaf manuscript, which states the whereabouts of a treasure in a rock cave that belongs to an ancient king. However, according to the manuscript, he has to sacrifice the life of a virgin woman who has four black birth marks in her neck, in order to gain access to the treasure.

One day when he walk by a river, he accidentally comes across a young lady (Malini Fonseka), who has four black birth marks in her neck. After following the lady and collecting information about her, he decides to marry her. He eventually marries the lady and spends time with her.

In the meantime, the lady notices that her husband always spends time thinking. One day she asks him as to what keeps the man thinking all the time. He replies that he has to do a religious custom to a god in a rock. So, his wife agrees with him and thereby arranges everything for it.

After going to the rock, the man starts to fulfill the custom and finally he kills his wife as a sacrifice, with the hope of gaining access to the hidden treasure. But, unfortunately he is yet unable to get the treasure.

Sadly he comes home and decides to write the complete story, in his diary. After completing the story, he commits suicide by hanging himself.

Cast
 Gamini Fonseka as Wilson 'Willie' Abeynayake
 Malini Fonseka as Irene Abeynayake
 Francis Perera as Juwanis
 Saman Bokalawala as Mudliyar 'Julius'
 Mapa Gunaratne as Doctor
 Shanthi Lekha as Irene's Amma
 Trilicia Gunawardena as Dulcie
 Thilakasiri Fernando as Diyonis 'Gurunnanse'
 J. B. L. Gunasekera as Willie's Thaththa
 Thalatha Gunasekara as Willie's childhood nanny
 Kumarasinghe Appuhamy as Thelanis 'Gurunnanse'
 K. L. Coranelis Appuhamy as Willie's Aiyya
 Barry Whittington as MacNeal
 Wijeratne Warakagoda as Silva
 Devika Karunaratne as Royal coronation birthmark possessor

Restoration
In 2013, Shivendra Singh Dungarpur has collaborated with the World Cinema Foundation (WCF) for the restoration of the film. The film won the Silver Lion at the 1972 Venice International Film Festival.

Dr. Peries’ films are in a poor condition and many of the original camera negatives have been lost. This restoration is a joint effort of the WCF, the Sri Lankan National Film Corporation, Mr. Padmarajah (the copyright holder), and the National Film Archive of India (NFAI) and Sameera Randeniya of Film Team, Sri Lanka.

External links
National Film Corporation of Sri Lanka - Official Website
Official Website of Lester James Peries in association with Ministry of Cultural Affairs, Sri Lanka

References

1972 films
1970s Sinhala-language films
1972 drama films
Films directed by Lester James Peries
Films set in Sri Lanka (1948–present)
Sri Lankan drama films